Bo Östen Undén (25 August 1886 – 14 January 1974) was a Swedish academic (J.D.), civil servant and Social Democratic politician who served as acting Prime Minister of Sweden 6–11 October 1946, following the death of Per Albin Hansson (1885-1946).

In 1917, he was appointed professor and head of the department of civil law at Uppsala University, but he came to divide his career between politics and academia, which prompted his resignation from the position as rector magnificus (1929–1932) of that university. He served as the foreign ministry's expert on international law, as Minister for Foreign Affairs of Sweden 1924–1926 and 1945–1962, minister without portfolio 1917–1920 and 1932–1936, the government's chancellor for universities 1937–1951, and he chaired the parliament's committee on foreign relations during World War II.

Biography
Östen Undén was much respected, particularly within the Social Democratic Party, but was never uncontroversial. He belonged, together with Ernst Wigforss (1881–1977) clearly to the left-wing faction of the Social Democrats, and has in retrospect been criticised for a much too rosy view of the Soviet Union that remained for all of his time as Foreign Minister, ending in 1962.

At the same time, Undén must be acknowledged as a chief representative for Sweden's covert Cold War adaptation to the United States, as in his view Swedish governmental agencies, including the Defence Forces, were free to conclude any agreements with foreign powers and agencies that did not literally contradict international treaties Sweden was a party of as long as he and his ministry were not formally involved. As an effect, the Swedish government could even, before the founding of NATO, agree to build air bases in eastern Scandinavia suitable for bombing missions against Leningrad. A similar adaptation included integration in the US embargo policy from the Korean War.

In 1961, his "Undén Proposal"  argued that states without nuclear weapons should declare that they refused to produce such weapons and refuse to receive and store such weapons. Undén's proposal was accepted by the United Nations General Assembly as a UN resolution with 58 votes in favour (Scandinavia, Warsaw pact, third world countries), 10 votes against (NATO members) and 23 votes of abstention (Latin America, former French colonies in Africa).

References 

1886 births
1974 deaths
People from Karlstad
Swedish Social Democratic Party politicians
Swedish Ministers for Foreign Affairs
Uppsala University alumni
Rectors of Uppsala University
Members of the Första kammaren
Burials at Uppsala old cemetery
20th-century Swedish politicians
Rectors of universities and colleges in Sweden